Rabiul Alam Chowdhury is an Indian politician belonging to All India Trinamool Congress. He served as  MLA of Rejinagar from 2013.  His home town is Beldanga.

References

Living people
Trinamool Congress politicians from West Bengal
West Bengal MLAs 2011–2016
Year of birth missing (living people)
West Bengal MLAs 2016–2021